Fordsburg Square in Fordsburg is a thriving square that is the site of a flea market was recently known for being run-down. This square in Johannesburg is the location of a battle between striking miners and the South African police, army and air force.

Description
Fordsburg Square is the site of a flea market that was known for being run-down.

History

The Rand Rebellion against the powers of law and order ended here on the 14 March 1922. The uprising came out of a strike of black gold miners that started on `1 January 1922 in response to five shilling wage cut per shift. The White workers joined them ten days later because the owners of the mine had decided to cut costs by employing (cheaper) more black miners instead of the existing white workers. 

The workers did not just withdraw their labour but the a portion of the 20,000 white workers and the 180,000 black miners took over areas of Johannesburg and they were in control of Benoni, Brakpan suburbs of Fordsburg and Jeppe. The strike had become an open rebellion and on the 15 March the army was called to bombard the Fordsburg square which was deemed the stronghold of the rebels. By this time the rebels had dug substantial World War I trenches across the square. Even the South African Air Force was called to bomb this square but they hit the nearby Mint Road Presbyterian Church.

Today
One of the buildings that offered protection to the rebels was the municipal toilets and these are still standing and in use. In 2013 a Blue Plaque was added to the side of that building to commemorate the role that the square took in the History of South Africa.

References

Geography of Johannesburg
Squares in South Africa